"Whose Life (Is It Anyways?)" is a song by American thrash metal band Megadeth, written by Dave Mustaine. It is the third single and third track from their thirteenth studio album Thirteen, which was released on November 1, 2011. The song was released as a single on October 17, 2011. A lyric video for the song was released on May 2, 2012. The song was nominated in the Best Hard Rock/Metal Performance category at the 55th Grammy Awards, but lost to Halestorm's "Love Bites (So Do I)".

Background 
"Whose Life (Is It Anyways?)" was described by band frontman Dave Mustaine as energetic and youthful. "It's not the typical Megadeth track with a lot of riffing. It's more of a chord progression kind of thing; just a simple song."

"Whose Life (Is It Anyways?)" saw its radio debut during an appearance by Mustaine on the October 14–16, 2011, edition of the Full Metal Jackie radio show. For a 24-hour period from October 17 to October 18, 2011, the song was released as a free download through Megadeth's Facebook page.

The lyric video for the song was released on May 2, 2012, and followed the music video "Public Enemy No. 1". The video features large crowds holding signs which feature the song's lyrics. Loudwire described the video as "sinister yet appealing".

Track listing

Personnel 
Production and performance credits are adapted from Thirteens liner notes.MegadethDave Mustaine – guitars, lead vocals, acoustic guitar
David Ellefson – bass, backing vocals
Chris Broderick – guitars, backing vocals, acoustic guitar
Shawn Drover – drums, percussion, backing vocalsAdditional musiciansChris Rodriguez – backing vocalsProduction'
Produced by Johnny K and Dave Mustaine
Recorded, engineered, and mixed by Johnny K
Additional engineering by Dave Mustaine, Zachary Coleman, Ken Eisennagel and Andy Sneap
Mastered by Ted Jensen
Matt Dougherty – Digital editing and mix assistant

References 

Megadeth songs
2011 songs
2011 singles
Songs written by Dave Mustaine
Song recordings produced by Johnny K